Shubham Mavi (born 12 December 1997) is an Indian cricketer. He made his first-class debut on 17 December 2019, for Uttar Pradesh in the 2019–20 Ranji Trophy. Prior to his first-class debut, he was named in India's squad for the 2016 Under-19 Cricket World Cup.

References

External links
 

1997 births
Living people
Indian cricketers
Uttar Pradesh cricketers
People from Bulandshahr